Karl Pfeiffer may refer to:

Karl Pfeiffer, character in Friendly Enemies
Karl Pfeiffer, on List of Knight's Cross of the Iron Cross recipients (P)

See also
Carl Pfeiffer (disambiguation)
Karl Pfeffer-Wildenbruch